Lucas Silva Melo (born 4 July 1999), known as Tuta, is a Brazilian professional footballer who plays as a centre-back for Bundesliga club Eintracht Frankfurt.

He acquired his nickname due to his likeness to former Brazilian footballer Moacir Bastos, who is also known as Tuta.

Career
In January 2019, Tuta joined Bundesliga club Eintracht Frankfurt from São Paulo, signing a four-and-half-year contract lasting until 30 June 2023. In August 2019, Tuta joined Belgian club Kortrijk on a season-long loan from Frankfurt. He made his debut for Kortrijk in the Belgian First Division A on 24 November 2019, starting in the away match against Anderlecht, which finished as a 0–0 draw. He made 18 appearances and scored one goal for Kortrijk until April 2020, when the season was ended early due to the COVID-19 pandemic.

He returned to Frankfurt for the Bundesliga 2020-21 season and made four appearances for the club the first half of the season. After Eintracht team captain David Abraham retired from professional football in January 2021, Tuta became a starting player, playing in the central defense together with Evan Ndicka and Martin Hinteregger. Tuta scored his first goal for Frankfurt and in the Bundesliga on 30 October 2021, when he scored the late equalizer in a 1-1 draw against RB Leipzig.

Career statistics

Honours
Eintracht Frankfurt
UEFA Europa League: 2021–22

References

External links
 
 
 

1999 births
Living people
Footballers from São Paulo
Brazilian footballers
Association football central defenders
São Paulo FC players
Eintracht Frankfurt players
K.V. Kortrijk players
UEFA Europa League winning players
Belgian Pro League players
Bundesliga players
Brazilian expatriate footballers
Brazilian expatriate sportspeople in Germany
Expatriate footballers in Germany
Brazilian expatriate sportspeople in Belgium
Expatriate footballers in Belgium